John Freeman-Mitford, 1st Baron Redesdale, PC, KC, FRS (18 August 1748 – 16 January 1830), known as Sir John Mitford between 1793 and 1802, was an English lawyer and politician. He was Speaker of the House of Commons between 1801 and 1802 and Lord Chancellor of Ireland between 1802 and 1806.

Background
Born in London, Mitford was the younger son of John Mitford (d. 1761) of Exbury, Hampshire,
 and Philadelphia, daughter of Willey Reveley of Newton Underwood, Northumberland. The historian William Mitford was his elder brother. He was educated at Cheam School and studied law at the Inner Temple from 1772, being called to the bar in 1777.

Career
Having become a barrister of the Inner Temple in 1777, Mitford wrote A Treatise on the Pleadings in Suits in the Court of Chancery by English Bill, a work reprinted several times in England, Ireland, and America. He was made a King's Counsel in 1789.

In 1788, he became Member of Parliament for the borough of Bere Alston in Devon, and in 1791 he successfully introduced a bill for the relief of Roman Catholics, despite being himself a committed Anglican. In 1793 he succeeded Sir John Scott as Solicitor-General for England (receiving the customary knighthood at the same time), becoming Attorney General six years later, when he was returned to parliament as member for East Looe in Cornwall.

In 1794, he was elected a Fellow of the Royal Society.

In February 1801, Mitford was chosen Speaker of the House of Commons and sworn of the Privy Council. Exactly a year later, he was appointed Lord Chancellor of Ireland and raised to the peerage as Baron Redesdale, of Redesdale in the County of Northumberland. Being an outspoken opponent of Catholic Emancipation, Redesdale was unpopular in Ireland. He had little support from his own colleagues: he was the subject of scurrilous attacks by "Juverna", who was later discovered to be a senior judge, Robert Johnson,  who was convicted of seditious libel  and forced to resign from the Bench as a result. In February 1806, Redesdale was dismissed on the formation of the Ministry of All the Talents.

Although Lord Redesdale declined to return to official life, he was an active member of the House of Lords on its political and its judicial sides. In 1813, he secured the passing of acts for the relief of insolvent debtors, and became an opponent of the repeal of the Test and Corporation Acts and other popular measures of reform.

Family
Lord Redesdale married Lady Frances Perceval, daughter of John Perceval, 2nd Earl of Egmont, and sister of Prime Minister Spencer Perceval, in 1803. He took the additional name of Freeman in 1809 by royal licence on succeeding to the estates of his relative Thomas Edwards-Freeman (the heir of a previous Lord Chancellor of Ireland,
Richard Freeman. Lady Redesdale died in August 1817. Lord Redesdale survived her by thirteen years and died at Batsford Park, near Moreton-in-the-Marsh, Gloucestershire, in January 1830, aged 81. He was succeeded in the barony by his only son, John, who was created Earl of Redesdale in 1877.

Arms

References

External links

|-

1748 births
1830 deaths
People educated at Cheam School
Members of the Inner Temple
18th-century English lawyers
John
Peers of the United Kingdom created by George III
Fellows of the Royal Society
Lord chancellors of Ireland
British King's Counsel
Members of the Privy Council of the United Kingdom
Mitford, John
Mitford, John
Mitford, John
Mitford, John
Mitford, John
Mitford, John
UK MPs who were granted peerages
Mitford, John
Knights Bachelor
Members of the Privy Council of Ireland
John